Kate Cary (born 4 November 1967 in Birmingham, England) is an author, most well known for her work on the Warriors series.

Works 
Cary is a contributor to, alongside several others, the pen name Erin Hunter. She is also the single author of a series entitled Bloodline.

Warriors 
Cary has written Into the Wild, Fire and Ice, The Sight, The Last Hope and Bluestar's Prophecy, among other titles in the series. She stated that she becomes attached to the characters of the novels and usually feels distraught when writing death scenes. She also suggests that Loch Lomond offers her the inspiration for ThunderClan's territory in the novels.

Bloodline 
The first Bloodline book was written in 2005, simply entitled Bloodline. It is an unofficial sequel to Dracula and is an epistolary novel taking place during World War I. Kirkus Reviews praised its plot twists, but said that the novel had flat characterization. She also wrote a sequel titled Bloodline: Reckoning in 2007. Kirkus Reviews say that bad pacing and characterization hurt the story, but the tension is kept high by bluffs and mysteries.

Biography
Cary was born outside Birmingham on 4 November 1967. She wrote her first book when she was four years old, and has been enthusiastic about writing ever since. Cary stated that she has loved cats since the age of 6. She attended King Edward VI High School for Girls in Edgbaston, later moving to Surrey to study History at Royal Holloway, University of London (RHUL), where she graduated in 1989. After leaving the university, she began sending her books to publishers, regularly being rejected. Eventually, she discovered a small publisher who hired her to write "how to" and activity books. In 2003, Cary sent a writing sample to Victoria Holmes at Working Partners. Holmes offered her a position writing for the Warriors series, where she would share the workload with Cherith Baldry and Holmes herself in order to keep up with the publishing schedule.

Cary moved to Scotland in 1992, where she gave birth to her son, Joshua, in 1997. Cary returned to England in 2004, where she currently resides.

BlogClan 
Cary created an unofficial website for the Warriors series called BlogClan. She regularly posts on the site, where she is known by the username Cakestar, and has drawn attention from many fans of the series. The site has had multiple associated wikis and role-playing sites created by members.

References

External links

 Warriors (official)
 Kate Cary's blog
 
 
 Erin Hunter (shared pseudonym) at LC Authorities, with 79 records

1967 births
Living people
21st-century English novelists
British writers of young adult literature
English fantasy writers
English women novelists
Warriors (novel series)
Alumni of Royal Holloway, University of London
Women writers of young adult literature
21st-century English women writers
Women science fiction and fantasy writers
21st-century British short story writers
Writers of Gothic fiction